The Ole Miss Rebels football program represents the University of Mississippi, also known as "Ole Miss". The Rebels compete in the Football Bowl Subdivision (FBS) of the National Collegiate Athletic Association (NCAA) and the Western Division of the Southeastern Conference (SEC). The Rebels play their home games at Vaught–Hemingway Stadium on the university's campus in Oxford, Mississippi.

Founded in 1893 as the state's first football team, Ole Miss has won six Southeastern Conference titles, in 1947, 1954, 1955, 1960, 1962, and 1963. The team has been co-national champion once, with Minnesota in 1960 (the only time that Ole Miss has been acknowledged by the NCAA). Ole Miss, however, has never finished a season No. 1 in the AP or Coaches' Poll.

With a record of 24–14, Ole Miss has the second-highest post-season winning percentage of schools with 30 or more bowl appearances.

Thirty-three of the team's victories were vacated in 2019 as punishment for recruiting and academic violations under head coaches Houston Nutt and Hugh Freeze. 

As of 2022, the team's head coach is Lane Kiffin, who in 2021 led the team to its first-ever 10-2 regular season.

History

The Ole Miss football team played its first season in 1893, and have since fielded a team every year except for 1897 (due to a yellow fever epidemic) and 1943 (due to World War II). In that first season, the team compiled a 4–1 record under head coach Alexander Bondurant. In 1899, Ole Miss became a member of the Southern Intercollegiate Athletic Association (SIAA). The program joined the Southern Conference in 1922 and the Southeastern Conference in 1933.

Johnny Vaught era (1947–1970, 1973)
The modern era of Ole Miss football began in 1947, when Harold Drew was ousted in favor of his line coach, Johnny Vaught. A former All-American at Texas Christian University (TCU), Vaught led the Ole Miss program to national prominence over the next 24 years, posting 23 winning records and making the team a fixture in the national polls. Under Vaught, Ole Miss won the 1959 Dunkel System national championship; the 1960 Football Writers Association of America, Dunkel System, and Williamson System national championships; and the 1962 Litkenhous Ratings national championship.

Just 2-7 in 1946, the Rebels went 9–2 in Vaught's first season at the helm, winning the first of his six SEC titles (1947, 1954, 1955, 1960, 1962, 1963). The 1947 season also saw Ole Miss great Charlie Conerly become the first Rebel player to seriously contend for the Heisman Trophy, placing fourth in the voting.

The Rebels were among the winningest programs in the country during the 1950s. From 1950 to 1959, Ole Miss posted an 80–21–5 record (.778 winning percentage), third only to Oklahoma and Miami (OH) during that decade. Vaught's 1959 squad was honored as the "SEC Team of the Decade." 

In the 1960s, Vaught guided the Rebels to a 77–25–6 record and a .740 winning percentage, which was the ninth-best during that decade. The Rebels were ranked atop the Associated Press poll for three weeks during the 1960 season and one week during the 1961 campaign. The 1960 unit is the only team to win a national championship that is recognized by the NCAA and the college football community at large. That squad finished 10-0-1; the only blemish was a 6-6 tie against LSU. Ole Miss was presented with the Grantland Rice Trophy by the Football Writers of America after its Sugar Bowl victory, though that did not carry the same weight of the wire service voting (AP and Coaches' Poll) which selected Minnesota as the national champion.

The Rebels’ 1962 season is Ole Miss' only undefeated and untied season: 10–0. They capped off the season with a victory in the Sugar Bowl, but finished No. 3 in both major polls. In 1964, Ole Miss was ranked preseason No. 1 in the Associated Press poll, but finished with a dismal 5–5–1 record at seasons' end.

Vaught also made going to postseason play the norm rather than the exception for the Rebel football program. Ole Miss played in 15 consecutive bowl games from 1957 to 1971, a national record at the time. In all, Vaught led Ole Miss to 18 bowl games, posting a 10–8 record. For his efforts, Vaught was named SEC Coach of the Year six times (1947, 1948, 1954, 1955, 1960, 1962).

Vaught coached some of the best players in Ole Miss football history. and produced 26 All-America first-teamers. He also coached four players who finished in the top five in the Heisman Trophy voting: Conerly in 1947, Charlie Flowers (5th in 1959), Jake Gibbs (3rd in 1960), and Archie Manning (4th in 1969, 3rd in 1970).

Failing health forced Vaught to resign his position in 1970. He was succeeded by Billy Kinard.

No Ole Miss coach has since matched Vaught's longevity or winning percentage.

Billy R. Kinard era (1971–1973)
Billy Kinard, the first Ole Miss alumnus to head up the football program, won 10 games in 1971, fourth-most by a first-year head coach in NCAA Division I history, but was fired after going 5-5 in 1972 and starting the 1973 season 1-2.

Vaught was rehired to finish out the 1973 season, then resigned once again as head coach. As of 2022, his final record of 190–61–12 still ranks him in the top 25 winningest coaches in NCAA Division I history.

Kinard's tenure saw the team's first Black player, 79 years after the team started and a decade after the university admitted its first Black student. Ben Williams, a defensive tackle, recruited out of a small school in the Delta region of Mississippi, eventually claimed All-SEC honors and had a long and successful NFL career following his stint at Ole Miss.

Ken Cooper era (1974–1977)
Ken Cooper, an assistant under Kinard since 1971, was named head coach on January 17, 1974, and took Ole Miss through the 1977 season. Cooper compiled a 21–23 record, and his tenure is probably best remembered for the September 1977 upset of Notre Dame, who finished the season 11–1 and AP and UPI national champion.

Steve Sloan era (1978–1982)
Steve Sloan, the former All-American quarterback at Alabama under Paul "Bear" Bryant, posted a 20–34 record from 1978 to 1982.

Billy Brewer era (1983–1993)
After stepping outside the Ole Miss family football tree the previous nine seasons, former Rebel star player Billy Brewer took over as head coach in December 1982. In his 11 seasons as head coach, Brewer led the Rebels to five winning seasons and four bowls, including Ole Miss' 1990 New Year's Day Gator Bowl appearance, which was the program's first January bowl game since 1969. He was named SEC Coach of the Year in 1986 (8–3–1 record) and 1990 (9–3 record), and in 1986, the Rebels returned to the national rankings for the first time in over a decade. He compiled a 68–55–3 record and led Ole Miss to eight Egg Bowl victories over rival Mississippi State.

Brewer was dismissed just before the 1994 season after the NCAA infractions committee found him guilty of "unethical conduct," Ole Miss defensive coordinator Joe Lee Dunn finished the season as interim coach.

Tommy Tuberville era (1995–1998)
Hired on December 2, 1994, Tommy Tuberville led the 1995 Rebels to a 6–5 record and an Egg Bowl victory over Mississippi State. In 1997, Ole Miss recorded its best season in five years with an 8–4 record, a thrilling 15–14 Egg Bowl victory over Mississippi State and a Motor City Bowl win over Marshall University. The bowl appearance was the program's first since 1992, and the Rebels earned a final national ranking of No. 22 in both polls. 

During the 1998 season, Tuberville repeatedly said he would not leave Ole Miss. With a month to go before the team's bowl game, he told alumni, "They'll have to take me out of here in a pine box". Two days later, he accepted the job of head coach at SEC West rival Auburn University.

David Cutcliffe era (1998–2004)
David Cutcliffe took over as head coach on December 2, 1998, just 29 days before the Rebels met Texas Tech in the Sanford Independence Bowl. They prevailed, 35–18, in arguably the biggest upset of the 1998 bowl season.

Instilling a high-powered offensive style, Cutcliffe had four winning seasons in his first five seasons at Ole Miss, in 1999 (8–4), 2000 (7–5), 2001 (7–4) and 2002 (7–6), becoming the first Rebel mentor since Harry Mehre (1938–41) to post winning marks in his first five years. From 1997 to 2003, the Rebels played in six bowl games, tied with Arkansas for the most bowl appearances among SEC Western Division schools during that span. In 2003, Cutcliffe guided the Rebels to a 10–3 overall mark and a share of the SEC West title with eventual BCS National Champion LSU. 

Despite his 44–29 record, five straight winning seasons, and guiding the team to its first 10 win season in over 30 years, Cutcliffe was fired by Ole Miss's Athletic Director Pete Boone in December 2004 after the team posted a disappointing 4–7 record and a third consecutive loss to LSU.

Ed Orgeron era (2005–2007)

Ed Orgeron took over on December 16, 2004. Named the 2004 National Recruiter of the Year by The Sporting News and Rivals.com, he compiled two of the best-ranking signing classes in 2006 and 2007. This did not lead to on-the-field success. In 2007, Ole Miss was last in the SEC in scoring offense, turnover margin, rushing offense, rushing defense, punt returns, opponent first downs, red-zone offense, opponent third-down conversions, field goal percentage, time of possession and kickoff coverage.

The 2007 season was an unmitigated disaster for the Rebels. They went winless in the SEC for the first time since 1982 and ended the season at 3–9 (0–8 in SEC play). Orgeron was fired on November 24, 2007.

Houston Nutt era (2008–2011)

Three days later, Houston Nutt was hired as the next head football coach, just five weeks after he defeated Ole Miss as the head coach of the Arkansas Razorbacks.

During Nutt's first season, he guided the Ole Miss Rebels to a 9–4 record with marquee victories over the eventual BCS National Champion Florida Gators, the reigning BCS National Champion LSU Tigers, and the Texas Tech Red Raiders in the 2009 Cotton Bowl Classic. The Rebels posted their 600th win on September 27, 2008, when they defeated the Gators 31–30. At season's end, the Rebels were ranked in the Top 15 in both major polls.

But in the 2010 and 2011 seasons, the Rebels won a total of six games, and in the latter season, went winless in SEC play. On November 7, 2011, athletic director Pete Boone forced Nutt to resign, effective at the end of the season, citing what ESPN called the program's "total decline".

NCAA investigators later concluded that Nutt had allowed athletes to play while ineligible. In 2019, the NCAA punished Ole Miss for these violations and others committed by his successor, Hugh Freeze, by stripping the team of 33 wins over six seasons. This included all four wins in 2010 and two wins in 2011, making those season the Rebels' first official winless ones in more than a century.

Hugh Freeze era (2011–2017)

On December 5, 2011, Hugh Freeze became the new head coach. The team went 7–6 with a victory over Pitt in the BBVA Compass Bowl. In Freeze's second year, the Rebels went 8–5 (3–5), defeating then-sixth-ranked LSU on a last-second field goal in Oxford, then beating Georgia Tech, 25–17, in the Music City Bowl.

In 2014, Freeze led Ole Miss to one of its strongest seasons in four decades. The Rebels spent most of the season in the top 10, rising as high as third in October—their highest ranking at that late stage in the season in almost half a century. They ultimately finished 9–3, only the third time since Vaught's tenure that a Rebel team has won as many as nine games. This garnered them a berth in the 2014 Peach Bowl, their first major-bowl appearance since 1969. In 2015, Freeze led to the Rebels to perhaps the program's strongest season since 1962, when the team went undefeated and untied, with wins over ranked SEC West Rivals LSU and Mississippi State, and was headlined by a road victory over No. 2-ranked Alabama, their first win in Tuscaloosa since 1988 and the first time they had beaten the Tide in back-to-back seasons. The Rebels earned a trip to the 2016 Sugar Bowl, their first appearance in this bowl game since 1970, where they beat Oklahoma State 48–20. Freeze led the Rebels to their first 10-win season since 2003, and only the third since the Vaught era.

On July 20, 2017, Freeze resigned after Ole Miss officials learned that he had used a university-provided cell phone to place calls to an escort service in "a concerning pattern" that began shortly after he took the job in 2011.

NCAA investigators later concluded that Freeze had cheated on 15 occasions by breaking recruiting rules and allowing students to play who had not maintained the required academic standing; they also determined that his predecessor, Nutt, had broken similar rules. University officials quickly attempted to paint Nutt as the main culprit instead of Freeze. Nutt sued for defamation, and the university settled the suit and issued a public apology.

This constituted one of the worst violations ever, and in 2019 the NCAA punished Ole Miss by stripping the team of 33 wins over six seasons, including seven from 2012, eight from 2014, and five from 2016. This changed Freeze's official record at Ole Miss from 39–25 over five seasons to 12–25. The NCAA also banned the team from postseason play for two years, stripped it of scholarships for four years, and placed it on three years of probation. In 2019, the NCAA vacated 33 of the team's victories dating from 2010 to 2016 and levied a two-year ban on postseason play as punishment for recruiting and academic violations under both Nutt and Freeze.

Meanwhile, the team's star quarterback and other players told NCAA officials that Freeze had lied to them about the charges while he recruited them. They requested waivers to quickly play for other teams, and were granted them.

Matt Luke era (2017–2019) 
Co-offensive coordinator Matt Luke was named interim head coach the same day. In November 2017, Luke was named the permanent head coach after leading the Rebels to a 6–6 record, including a 31–28 Egg Bowl win over Mississippi State.  In the 2019 Egg Bowl, Luke's recruit Elijah Moore performed a post-touchdown mockery of a urinating dog, costing the Rebels a penalty and ultimately losing the game by a missed extra point 20–21. Luke was dismissed after the game.

Lane Kiffin era (2020–present) 

On December 7, 2019, Lane Kiffin was named as the next head coach at Ole Miss. 

In his first season as Ole Miss coach, Kiffin compiled a 5–5 record in an all-SEC Conference schedule, including a 26–20 win over Indiana in the Outback Bowl in Tampa, Florida.

In 2021, Kiffin piloted the Rebels to a 10–2 regular-season record, the best regular-season record in school history, going 6–2 in conference and finishing 11th in both major polls. A 21–7 loss to Baylor in the 2022 Sugar Bowl in New Orleans, Louisiana, left the Rebels with a final record of 10–3, only the eighth time in school history that the football team has recorded 10 wins in a season.

In 2022, the Rebels compiled an 8–3 record and were ranked #20 in the AP poll in week 12.

Conference affiliations
Ole Miss has been affiliated with the following conferences.
 Independent (1893–1904)
 Southern Intercollegiate Athletic Association (1905–1921) 
 Southern Conference (1922–1932)
 Southeastern Conference (1933–present)

Championships

National championships
Ole Miss has been selected national champion three times by NCAA-designated major selectors in 1959, 1960 and 1962. But the two major wire-service polls of the time (AP Poll and Coaches' Poll), named Syracuse, Minnesota, and Southern California as the national champions in those years, respectively.

In 1960, the final Associated Press (AP) and United Press International (UPI) polls placed the Rebels second and third, respectively, behind the national champion Minnesota Golden Gophers. Students made “AP” and “UPI” dummies, hung them from the Union Building, and burned them while chanting, “We’re No. 1, to hell with AP and UPI.” The Gophers, however, subsequently lost the Rose Bowl to Washington, and Ole Miss defeated Rice, 14–6, in the Sugar Bowl, leading the Football Writers Association of America (FWAA) to vote Mississippi as national champions. This is the only national championship recognized by the NCAA.

Ole Miss has never finished a season ranked No. 1 in the AP or Coaches' Poll.

Conference championships
Ole Miss has won six SEC championships.

Divisional championship
The SEC has been split into two divisions since the 1992 season with Ole Miss competing in the SEC West since that time. Ole Miss has won a share of one divisional title, but has yet to make an appearance in the SEC Championship Game.

† Co-champions

Head coaches
Ole Miss has had 38 head coaches in over a century of play.

† Includes interim status

Bowl games

 

Ole Miss has participated in 40 bowl games and compiled a record of 24–15 through the 2022 season. The school's victory in the 2013 BBVA Compass Bowl was subsequently vacated and is not included.

Milestones

 Most points scored in a game by Ole Miss came in a 114–0 win over Union College on October 29, 1904.
 Ole Miss became the nation's first college football team to fly "en masse" to a game in 1937. The team flew from Memphis to Philadelphia to play Temple University Temple Owls. (University of New Mexico took the first flight of any team in 1929.)
 Ole Miss' first game to be broadcast on television was in 1948 against Memphis.
 The speed limit on the Ole Miss campus is 18 mph in honor of Archie Manning, who wore the number during his playing days at Ole Miss. After Archie's son Eli Manning won his second Super Bowl, the university changed the speed limit in some areas of campus to 10 mph to honor the former All-American Rebel.
 Ole Miss plays a central role in Michael Lewis' book The Blind Side: Evolution of a Game and its 2009 film adaptation, The Blind Side.

Notable games
1952: Maryland- The 11th-ranked Rebels splashed onto the national scene by defeating the 3rd-ranked Maryland Terrapins in Oxford on November 15, 1952 by the score of 21–14. This game is credited by many for being the catalyst to the great run the Rebels had from 1952 to 1963.
1959: LSU- On Halloween night, No. 3-ranked Ole Miss squared off with No. 1-ranked LSU in Baton Rouge, LA.  The game was a defensive struggle with the Rebels clinging to a 3–0 lead in the fourth quarter. Future Heisman winner Billy Cannon changed the game off a fortuitous bounce on a punt return that went 89 yards. The replay is still played whenever a reference to this rivalry is made.  Ole Miss had one last chance to pull off the win, but was stopped short on 4th and a yard at the goal-line by Billy Cannon. LSU won 7–3.
1960: LSU- On January 1, 1960, one of the most anticipated rematches in college football history took place, but No. 2-ranked Ole Miss dominated No. 1-ranked LSU from start to finish and came away with a decisive 21–0 win over the Tigers. The Rebels finished the season having only given up 21 points all year, declared national champions by several polls, and named the third-rated team in history (through 1995) by the Sagarin ratings, behind only two great Nebraska teams.
1969: Tennessee More affectionately known as, "The Mule Game" or "The Jackson Massacre", the 18th-ranked Rebels faced off against the 3rd-ranked Tennessee Volunteers in Jackson MS. Prior to the game, Tennessee's Steve Kiner was interviewed by Sports Illustrated.  When asked about the Rebels and all their horses in the backfield, Kiner replied, "...more like a bunch of mules."  When asked specifically about Archie Manning, he responded, "Archie who?"  This inspired the Rebels and to a 38–0 shellacking of the Vols, a win that pushed the Rebels into the 1970 Sugar Bowl
1977: Notre Dame- On a hot, humid day, the Rebels took advantage of the weather to stun the third-ranked Irish 20–13. It was the only loss for the Irish that season as they went on to claim the 1977 AP national championship.
1986: LSU- Billy Brewer's 5–2–1 Rebels entered Tiger Stadium, where they had not won since 1968, to face 12-ranked LSU. Ole Miss sophomore quarterback Mark Young and the Rebels built a 21–9 halftime lead. LSU stormed back in the second. With 12:09 remaining, LSU's David Browndyke booted a 21-yard FG that trimmed the lead to 21–19. Later, LSU QB Tommy Hodson led the Tigers from the LSU 34 to the Rebel 13. But with only 0:09 to play, Browndyke's potential game-winning 30-yard FG sailed wide left and ignited a wild celebration among Rebel fans jammed into southeast corner of Tiger Stadium.
1997: LSU—After a harsh two-season bowl ban, Tommy Tuberville's 1997 Rebels squad arrived in Baton Rouge with a 3–2 record and in search of a signature win. Meanwhile, the 5–1 and No. 8-ranked Tigers entered fresh off an upset of then No. 1-ranked Florida. After trailing 21–14 at the half, the Rebels dominated the second half, outscoring the Tigers 22–0 en route to a 36–21 win. Ole Miss QB Stewart Patridge threw for a career-high 346 yards with two touchdowns. John Avery rushed for 137 yards and two scores. Their combined efforts accounted for all but five of the Rebels’ 488 yards of total offense. The celebrated win at Tiger Stadium was the first for Ole Miss over a top 10 opponent since 1977. Ole Miss fished the season with a record of 8–4 (4–4 SEC) that included a Motor City Bowl win over Marshall.
2008: Florida- After three years of SEC purgatory, the Rebels desperately needed a spark.  That spark came in the form of defeating the fourth ranked Florida Gators 31–30 in Gainesville.  Ole Miss took a 31–24 lead with 5 minutes to go in the game on an 86-yard touchdown pass thrown by Jevan Snead to Shay Hodge. Florida responded within two minutes to bring the game within one, only to have their PAT blocked by Kentrell Lockett. Florida regained possession but turned the ball over on downs after Heisman winner Tim Tebow was stopped on fourth-and-one. The win would catapult the Rebels to back-to-back Cotton Bowl victories. The win gave Ole Miss their 600th win all-time.
2014: Alabama- The 11th-ranked Ole Miss Rebels fought back from a 14–3 halftime deficit to knock off No. 3-ranked Alabama for the first time since 2003. Led by senior quarterback Bo Wallace's 3 touchdown passes and the nation's 2nd ranked defense, the Rebels made an emphatic statement that they were real title contenders.
2015: Alabama- On September 19, 2015, Head Coach Hugh Freeze's AP No. 15 Rebels beat the AP No. 2 Alabama Crimson Tide, 43–37, in Tuscaloosa, making Freeze only the third head coach, along with Les Miles and Steve Spurrier, to defeat a Nick Saban-coached team in back-to-back years. It was also the first time Ole Miss had beaten any Alabama team twice in a row and only the second Rebel win in Tuscaloosa (the only other having come in 1988 under Billy Brewer).  The Tide turned the ball over five times, a number which includes two attempted kickoff returns and three interceptions by three different Ole Miss defenders, Trae Elston, C.J. Johnson, and Tony Bridges.  The 2015 victory catapulted the Rebels to the No. 3 spot in the Associated Press Week 3 rankings.

Uniforms

Ole Miss primarily uses four jersey options along with two pant styles and two helmet variations. They often mix and match these jerseys, helmets, and pants to create a wide range of uniform combinations. Since the 2017 season, Ole Miss has taken the field in at least ten different uniform combinations. The Rebels have traditionally used red jerseys for their primary home uniforms and blue jerseys as alternates; both have bold white numbers and white vertical shoulder stripes. The Rebels have also made extensive use of their new "powder blues," a uniform combination consisting of solid white pants, a powder blue jersey with white shoulder stripes, and the powder blue helmet. This uniform combination started as an alternate uniform, but has become very popular among fans and players; since the 2020 season it has been worn as the primary home uniform. White jerseys with red numbers and stripes are typically used on the road. These jerseys are paired with either gray pants with red and blue stripes or solid white pants, though for the 2018 season were paired with white pants with red stripes as part of a "white out" uniform combination. A similar white road uniform with navy stripes and letters has also been used.

Typically, Ole Miss uses one of two helmet designs. The Rebels’ traditional primary helmet is navy blue with a single red stripe and “Ole Miss” written in script on each side. The other helmet's blue is a lighter color, a shade known as “powder blue.” In recent years, the powder blue helmet has seen more and more use. Since its reintroduction in the 2019 season, the Rebels have worn powder blue helmets in over half their games, typically with their red or white jerseys, and have arguably become the teams primary helmet.

In 2017, Ole Miss used special helmets for a military-appreciation game against Louisiana and a rivalry game against LSU. The military appreciation helmets, which have been worn multiple times since then in both navy and powder blue variations, were the same as the primary design, except the logo on each side of the helmet was filled with an American flag design. The helmets worn against LSU were powder blue with jersey numbers on each side, similar to a design worn by the Rebels in the 1960s.

Rivalries

Mississippi State

The Battle for the Golden Egg (nicknamed the Egg Bowl) is the Rebels' last game of the season against in-state SEC rival Mississippi State University (MSU). The teams have played each other 114 times since 1901, and the first game officially known as "The Battle of the Golden Egg" was in 1927. The game gets its name from the trophy awarded to the winner of the contest; the football element of the trophy is based on the much more ovoid and rounded football used in 1927 when it was designed, and resembles a large golden egg. While it is called a "Bowl", the game is not a postseason bowl game but a regular season SEC game. Twenty-nine Egg Bowls have been played on Thanksgiving Day. Ole Miss leads the series with 64–46–6.

In 2014, the game gained much more national attention due to the postseason implications the game possessed. Although both teams were considered to be Playoff contenders mid-season when the Bulldogs were #1 and the Rebels were #3, they each suffered a loss (Mississippi State had 1 loss at the time while Ole Miss had 3 losses). The postseason implications were still high, however. Mississippi State entered the game with a No. 4 ranking in College Football Playoff, and had a spot in the Playoff on the line entering the game against No. 19 Ole Miss. MSU also had a chance at making the SEC title game, where they needed a win and an Alabama loss. In an upset, Ole Miss beat the Bulldogs 31–17 and jumped from No. 19 to No. 9 in the College Football Playoff rankings. Both schools got New Year's Six bowl games, although neither would win their bowl games (Ole Miss lost 42-3 to TCU in the Peach Bowl and Mississippi State lost 49-34 to Georgia Tech in the Orange Bowl). Ole Miss would later vacate this win due to NCAA violations.

Ole Miss entered the 2015 Egg Bowl with a No. 18 ranking in the College Football Playoff rankings, and MSU was No. 21. The game was considered to be a play-in game for the Sugar Bowl as Florida, who had been predicted by many to get the bid, lost 27-2 to rival Florida State that same day. Ole Miss entered the game as only two point favorites but won the Egg Bowl convincingly 38–27 and led by 25 points at halftime. This was Ole Miss's first road win against Mississippi State since 2003, and the first time that the Rebels beat the Bulldogs two years in a row since 2003–04.

LSU

Ole Miss first played LSU on December 3, 1894, winning 26–6 in Baton Rouge, Louisiana. Throughout the fifties and sixties, games between the two schools featured highly ranked squads on both sides and several matchups had conference, and at times, national title implications. Since then, the rivalry has only had one contest with significant national title implications. The 2003 loss to LSU decided the SEC Western Division Champion, and helped propel LSU to a national championship.

The student bodies at both universities created a trophy for the LSU–Ole Miss rivalry in 2008, and renamed the matchup the "Magnolia Bowl." Ole Miss won the first two official Magnolia Bowls in 2008 31–13 and 2009 25–23.  LSU won their first official Magnolia Bowl in 2010 with a last minute score, 43–36.

The 2010s featured several memorable Magnolia Bowls. LSU humiliated the Rebels 52–3 at Oxford in 2010.Les Miles ordered third-string quarterback Zach Mettenberger to take a knee four times after LSU gained a first-and-goal at the Ole Miss 1-yard line with five minutes to play.  The Rebels lost the 2012 Magnolia Bowl 35-41 during the last minute of the game when LSU's Jeremy Hill scored a 1 yd touchdown run. On October 19, 2013 an unranked Rebel team beat the No. 6 ranked Tigers 27-24 on a last-second 46-yard field goal. In 2014, Ole Miss entered with a No. 3 ranking. No. 24 LSU pulled the upset by beating the Rebels 10–7 on a last–minute interception thrown by Rebels' quarterback Bo Wallace. In 2015, No. 22 Ole Miss upset No. 15 LSU 38–17, which was Ole Miss's largest margin of victory over LSU since 1992. After 2015, Ole Miss would not beat LSU again until 2021, when the No. 12 Rebels won 31-17 in front of a sellout crowd on the day Ole Miss Legend Eli Manning's jersey was being retired. The following year, however, unranked LSU won convincingly 45-20 over No. 7 Ole Miss in Death Valley after the Rebels suffered a second half collapse.

LSU leads the overall series over Ole Miss 64–41–4; since the creation of the Magnolia Bowl, LSU leads the series, 9–5.

Arkansas

Ole Miss first played Arkansas in 1908, with Arkansas winning that game 33–0. They would play each other many times, though sporadically, over the next several decades, including two meetings in the Sugar Bowl in 1963 and 1970; Ole Miss won both Sugar Bowl matchups.

The two teams have played each other annually since 1981. In the 1980s, Arkansas dominated the Rebels.  The 1990 meeting between the two teams ended memorably.  Having the ball inside the Ole Miss 20 and trailing by 4 with seconds remaining, Arkansas needed a score.  The Hogs handed the ball to running back Ron Dickerson who seemed to have an open path to the endzone.  At the goal line, Safety Chris Mitchell stopped Dickerson at the one yard line as time expired. In 1991, Arkansas joined the Southeastern Conference. The next year the SEC divided into two divisions. Both teams were placed in the SEC West.  Ole Miss won the first conference contest in Little Rock by a score of 17–3.

During the 2000s, the rivalry was reignited by a series of close games and coaching changes. The 2001 Ole Miss–Arkansas game set an NCAA record for most overtime periods played (7). Arkansas won that game 58–56 off a 2-point Rebel conversion that got stopped just short of the goal line. Since then, five FBS football games have reached seven overtime periods. In November 2007, Houston Nutt resigned as the head coach for Arkansas and was hired as Ole Miss' head coach a week later. 2008 saw the first game between Ole Miss and Arkansas after Nutt left Arkansas to coach Ole Miss. The Rebels kicked a field goal with less than 3 minutes remaining to go up 23–14, but Arkansas scored with a minute left. Arkansas was awarded with the recovery of an onside kick, but received a penalty for offensive pass interference before turning the ball over on downs. Ole Miss and Nutt won 23–21. The following season, Ole Miss won 30–17 led by running back Dexter McCluster who had over 200 all purpose yards, including a 60 yd touchdown in the 3rd quarter. In 2010, Arkansas finally beat their former coach Houston Nutt after a 38-24 game in Fayetteville. In 2015, the Rebels' 52-53 loss to Arkansas saw them fall out of first place in the SEC West and lose the division.

Alabama

The Alabama–Ole Miss football rivalry is an American college football rivalry between the Alabama Crimson Tide and Ole Miss Rebels. Both universities are founding members of the Southeastern Conference (SEC), and have competed in the SEC Western Division since the 1992 season.

It has been one of the conference's most lopsided rivalries. Alabama leads the series 53–10–2 (50–9–2 without NCAA vacations and forfeits). From 2004 to 2013, Alabama won every game between the two teams, including six wins by double digits. However, in 2014, No. 11 Ole Miss beat No. 3 Alabama 23-17 for the first time since 2003. Ole Miss cornerback Senquez Golson sealed the victory with an interception in the fourth quarter. The victory catapulted Ole Miss to No. 3 in the AP Poll, their highest ranking since 1964. In 2015, Ole Miss visited Alabama as double digit underdogs. The Rebels upset the No. 2 Crimson Tide 43-37 for their second ever victory in Tuscaloosa. This marked the first time Ole Miss had beaten Alabama in back to back seasons. Following the upset, Ole Miss jumped to No. 3 in the AP Poll, marking the first time that Ole Miss had been ranked in the top three in consecutive seasons since 1963–64.

Vanderbilt

Vanderbilt and Ole Miss have played annually since 1942. When the SEC split into divisions in 1992, the Commodores and Rebels were selected as permanent cross-division rivals. Ole Miss leads the all-time series 52–40–2. The Rebels have won 16 of the last 24 games, including nine games by double digits. However, Vanderbilt has sustained the rivalry with a surprising blow-out victory over the Rebels in 2016.

Auburn

Auburn leads the series 35–10 through the 2021 season.

Memphis

The Ole Miss–Memphis football rivalry has also been a far less competitive rivalry series. The Rebels hold a 47–12–2 advantage over the Tigers in this non-conference series. The two schools have met 62 times from 1921 to 2019.

Ole Miss won every game between 2005-2009, and the teams temporarily suspended competition from 2010 to 2013. The rivalry was resumed in 2014. Ole Miss won the game 24–3 to increase their winning streak against Memphis to six straight. In 2015, The Tigers upset No. 13 Ole Miss, 37–24. The Rebels fell 11 spots in the AP Poll to No. 24 and Memphis entered the rankings at No. 18. It was the Tigers' first victory over a ranked team since defeating No. 6 Tennessee in 1996. Memphis won the most recent matchup 15–10 on August 31, 2019. As of 2020, there are no future games scheduled between the two teams.

Tulane

Ole Miss and Tulane have been rivals since the time that Tulane was an SEC member. Ole Miss leads the series 42–28 through the 2021 season. Future games are scheduled for 2023 in New Orleans and 2025 in Oxford.

Team of the Century
In 1992, to commemorate the 100th year of Ole Miss football, the Ole Miss Athletic Department put together a so-called "Team of the Century," recognizing the outstanding accomplishments of 26 players.

The head coach for the Team of the Century was Johnny Vaught, who coached Ole Miss from 1947 to 1970 and again in 1973.

Offense

Defense

Special teams

Hall of Fame

College Football Hall of Fame

Ole Miss has nine players and two coaches in the College Football Hall of Fame.

† Charter member

‡ Played freshman year at Ole Miss, then appointed to the U.S. Military Academy where he played for Army as a sophomore, junior and senior

Pro Football Hall of Fame
There have been two Ole Miss players inducted into the Pro Football Hall of Fame.

Helms Athletic Foundation Hall of Fame

National Quarterback Club Hall of Fame
Ole Miss has one former player in the National Quarterback Club Hall of Fame.

Active in the NFL

Bobby Massie, OL, Chicago Bears
Brandon Bolden, RB, New England Patriots
Donte Moncrief, WR, Houston Texans
Laremy Tunsil, OL, Houston Texans
Mike Hilton, DB, Cincinnati Bengals
Woodrow Hamilton, DL, Tennessee Titans
Evan Engram, TE, New York Giants
D. J. Jones, DL, Denver Broncos
Marquis Haynes, DE, Carolina Panthers
Lavon Hooks, DE, Pittsburgh Steelers
A. J. Moore, CB, Houston Texans
Jordan Wilkins, RB, Indianapolis Colts
Greg Little, OL, Carolina Panthers
A. J. Brown, WR, Philadelphia Eagles
DK Metcalf, WR, Seattle Seahawks
Dawson Knox, TE, Buffalo Bills
Javon Patterson, OL, Cleveland Browns
Kendarius Webster, CB, San Francisco 49ers
Elijah Moore, WR, New York Jets
Cody Core, WR, Miami Dolphins
Benito Jones, DL, Miami Dolphins
Matt Corral, QB, Carolina Panthers
Snoop Conner, RB Jacksonville Jaguars
Jerrion Ealy, RB Kansas City Chiefs
Sam Williams (defensive end, born 1999), DE Dallas Cowboys

Tailgating

Confederate symbols

The team has long associated itself with the Confederacy. Since 1936, the team has gone by the name Rebels, a nickname for the secessionist military force that fought against the United States during the American Civil War. 

In 1936, the team introduced a mascot, Colonel Reb, a cartoonish, older-aged gentleman in plantation-owner's garb whose name alludes to service in the Confederate States Army; in 1979, the team would add a student costumed as Colonel Reb to the cheerleading squad. In the 1940s, students began waving the Confederate battle flag in the football stands; the team followed suit. The marching band began playing "Dixie" around 1948, according to David Sansing, Ole Miss professor emeritus of history and author of the sesquicentennial history of the university.  “I think it really was adopted around the combination of the [university's] centennial and the Dixiecrat movement in the South,” Sansing said. “1948 was the centennial celebration, and that’s when Ole Miss was cloaked and covered with all the memorabilia of the Confederacy.” 

Though the team is still called the Rebels, its embrace of Confederate symbols began to change in 1983, two decades after the school was integrated at bayonet point. That September, John Hawkins, a Black cheerleader for Ole Miss, refused to carry the battle flag onto the home stadium's football field, as was long custom. To quell the outcry that followed, school Chancellor Porter L. Fortune Jr. banned the official use of the flag but said students could continue to wave it.

In 1997, the university banned flag poles at games, an attempt to stop the waving of Confederate flags without directly confronting fans who wanted to do so. The step was taken after head coach Tommy Tuberville complained that the flag-waving had hampered his attempts to recruit top-notch Black athletes. Coaches before Tuberville also expressed concerns about the difficulty of recruiting black athletes.

In 2003, the school ended the use of the costumed Colonel Reb mascot at athletic events, though it would sell official Colonel Reb merchandise through the end of the decade. An unofficial Colonel Reb mascot still makes appearances in The Grove, Ole Miss' tailgating area, before home games.

In 2009, the university chancellor asked the school's marching band to stop playing "From Dixie with Love", an early-1980s fight song that combined elements of "Dixie" and the "Battle Hymn of the Republic". Students had customarily chanted "The South will rise again", a reference to the Lost Cause pseudohistory, during the song's final line.

In 2010, the university began to phase out the use of Colonel Reb on official merchandise such as hats and shirts; it reclassified the Colonel Reb trademark as a historical mark of the university. After a polling and a February 2010 campus vote, officials announced on October 14, 2010, that students, alumni and season ticket holders at the university had picked Rebel Black Bear as their new mascot. The bear beat out two other finalists, the Rebel Land Shark and something called the "Hotty Toddy," an attempt to personify the school cheer. (The bear would be replaced in 2018, by the Landshark, a reference to a celebratory hand symbol that players began using in 2008.)

In 2016, the athletic department banned "Dixie" itself as well as a medley that included a "Dixie" theme. Later that year, Chancellor Jeffrey Vitter asserted that the name "Rebels" was no longer used to refer to the Confederacy but "is used today in a completely different and positive way: to indicate someone who bucks the status quo, an entrepreneur, a trendsetter, a leader".

Team honors

Chucky Mullins Courage Award
At the end of each spring's practices, the team plays the Grove Bowl, which pits Ole Miss players against each other. The senior defensive player who most embodies Chucky Mullins' spirit and courage receives the "Chucky Mullins Memorial Courage Award" and the right to wear Mullins' No. 38 jersey, which was otherwise retired in 2006.

Recipients
 1990 – Chris Mitchell
 1991 – Jeff Carter
 1992 – Trea Southerland
 1993 – Johnny Dixon
 1994 – Alundice Brice
 1995 – Michael Lowery
 1996 – Derek Jones
 1997 – Nate Wayne
 1998 – Gary Thigpen
 1999 – Ronnie Heard
 2000 – Anthony Magee
 2001 – Kevin Thomas
 2002 – Lanier Goethie
 2003 – Jamil Northcutt
 2004 – Eric Oliver
 2005 – Kelvin Robinson
 2006 – Patrick Willis
 2007 – Jeremy Garrett
 2008 – Jamarca Sanford
 2009 – Marcus Tillman
 2010 – Kentrell Lockett
 2011 – D. T. Shackelford
 2012 – Jason Jones
 2013 – Mike Marry
 2014 – D. T. Shackelford
 2015 – Mike Hilton
 2016 – John Youngblood
 2017 – Marquis Haynes
 2018 – C. J. Moore
 2019 – Austrian Robinson
 2020 – Jaylon Jones
 2021 – Keidron Smith
 2022 — KD Hill

Retired numbers

Notes

Future opponents

Intra-division opponents
Ole Miss plays the other six SEC West opponents once per season.

Non-division opponents 
Ole Miss plays Vanderbilt as a permanent non-division opponent annually and rotates around the East division among the other six schools.

Non-conference opponents 
Announced schedules as of April 26, 2020.
No games scheduled for the 2035-2036 seasons.

References

External links

 

 
American football teams established in 1890
1890 establishments in Mississippi